Laudon may refer to:

 Laudon Symphony, a symphony by Joseph Haydn in C major
 Laudon (river), a river that feeds Lake Annecy
 Mount Laudon, Antarctica

People with the surname
 Adolf Laudon (1912–1984), Austrian football player
 Ernst Gideon von Laudon (1717–1790), Austrian military officer
 Kenneth C. Laudon, an American professor of information systems
 Lowell Robert Laudon (1905–1993), American paleontologist, worked with Raymond Cecil Moore